Alto de Coloane (Portuguese: Alto de Coloane) is the highest point of Macau. The  mountain is located on the island of Coloane.

See also
 Geography of Macau

External links

Coloane Alto
Coloane
Hills of China
Highest points of Chinese provinces